The Frontiersmen (sometimes erroneously labeled as The Frontiersman) is a 1938 American Western film directed by Lesley Selander and written by Norman Houston and Harrison Jacobs. The film stars William Boyd, George "Gabby" Hayes, Russell Hayden, Evelyn Venable, Charles Anthony Hughes, William Duncan, and Clara Kimball Young. The film was released on December 16, 1938, by Paramount Pictures.

Plot
A beautiful new school teacher arrives in town and changes the lives of the residents there, while at the same time Hopalong Cassidy notices a loss of livestock at the Bar 20 ranch.

Cast
 William Boyd as Hopalong Cassidy
 George "Gabby" Hayes as Windy Halliday 
 Russell Hayden as Lucky Jenkins
 Evelyn Venable as June Lake
 Charles Anthony Hughes as Mayor Judson Thorpe 
 William Duncan as Buck Peters
 Clara Kimball Young as Mrs. Amanda Peters
 Emily Fitzroy as Teacher that Quits
 Dickie Jones as Artie Peters
 John Beach as Henchman Quirt
 Roy Barcroft as Henchman Sutton
 The Robert Mitchell Boy Choir as The Crockett School's Chorus Boys

References

External links
 
 
 
 

1938 films
American black-and-white films
1930s English-language films
Films directed by Lesley Selander
Paramount Pictures films
American Western (genre) films
1938 Western (genre) films
Hopalong Cassidy films
1930s American films